Halima Soussi (born 29 August 1965 in Antibes, France) is a French basketball player. Soussi has had 211 selections on the French national women's basketball team from 1983-1996.

References 

1965 births
Living people
French women's basketball players